Zelenodolsk is the name of several inhabited localities in Russia.

Urban localities
Zelenodolsk, Republic of Tatarstan, a town in the Republic of Tatarstan

Rural localities
Zelenodolsk, Orenburg Oblast, a selo in Zelenodolsky Selsoviet of Kvarkensky District in Orenburg Oblast
Zelenodolsk, Sakhalin Oblast, a selo in Anivsky District of Sakhalin Oblast